The Ganahl revolver is an Austro-Hungarian version of the Colt Dragoon. It began to be used by the Austro-Hungarian Navy in 1850.

References
Walter Schultz, 1000 Handfeuerwaffen, 336 p., 

1849 introductions
Military revolvers
Early revolvers
Weapons of Austria-Hungary